Charles Greaves M Inst CE FGS FRSA (1816–1883), eldest son of Charles Greaves (d. 1829), was born in Great Amwell, Hertfordshire on 19 October 1816. He was articled to J. M. Rendel, a civil engineer in Plymouth from 1831 to 1837. He was in India from 1842 to 1847 when he made a survey for the Great Western railway of Bengal. He was engineer of East London waterworks from 1851 to 1875. In October 1872, he was presented with £1000 for his services in carrying out improved filter beds, pumping engines, et cetera, at a cost of one million. He was engineer at Westminster chambers, Victoria St., London from 1875 to 1878. He became a fellow of the Royal Meteorological Society in 1851, and was president of that society in 1879. He had a meteorological observatory in Surrey St. London from 1878 to 1883. He died at Sunhill, Clevedon on 4 November 1883.

References
Frederic Boase. "Greaves, Charles". Modern English Biography: A - H. Netherton and Worth. 1892. Page 1872.
The Building News and Engineering Journal. 1883. Volume 45. Page 746. Google Books.
The British Architect: A Journal of Architecture and the Accessory Arts. 1883. Volume 20. Page 217. Google Books.
"Obituary Notices". Minutes of Proceedings of the Institution of Civil Engineers. 1884. Volume 76. Page 355. Google Books.
Quarterly Journal of the Royal Meteorological Society. 1888. Volumes 9-10. Page 101. Google Books.
Garth Watson. The Smeatonians: The Society of Civil Engineers. Thomas Telford. 1989. Pages 70, 79 and 166.

1816 births
1883 deaths
English civil engineers
English meteorologists
People from Great Amwell